Ruabon F.C. were a football club based in the village of Ruabon near Wrexham, Wales.

History 
The club was founded on Thursday 25 September 1873 during a meeting at Ruabon National School. During the meeting Eban Edwards was selected as captain, and J.E. Davies as treasurer. Also present at the meeting was Llewelyn Kenrick, later of Druids FC and founder of the Football Association of Wales.

The club played its first match on Saturday 4 October at Vicarage Fields, an internal match between Edwards and Davies teams.

The club played in the inaugural Welsh Cup competition, losing 1–0 against Newtown White Stars in the first round. The following season, the club contested the Welsh Cup again, going out in the first round again after losing 1–0 against Chirk.

Cup History

Other Info
Ruabon F.C. are not to be confused with Ruabon Rovers F.C. who later became Plasmadoc FC and eventually Ruabon Druids F.C. who they should also not be confused with.

References

Sport in Wrexham County Borough
Association football clubs established in 1873
Ruabon
1873 establishments in Wales
1870s disestablishments in Wales
Football clubs in Wrexham
1879 disestablishments in the United Kingdom